Dixon Jones was a British architectural practice established in 1989 and closed in September 2020.

History
Dixon Jones was founded by Jeremy Dixon and Edward Jones in 1989 as a partnership and became a limited company in 2003. The founders first met at the Architectural Association. 

The practice closed in September 2020 after difficulties in securing new work and no clear succession plan.

Significant projects
Darwin College Study Centre, Cambridge University (1993)
National Portrait Gallery, London (2000)
Royal Opera House, London (1999)
Somerset House Masterplan, London (2001)
Saïd Business School, Oxford (2001)
Kings Place, London (2008)
Exhibition Road Masterplan (2011)
Westgate, Oxford (2017)

References

Architecture firms based in London
British companies established in 1989
1989 establishments in England